The Netherlands Bach Society is the oldest ensemble for Baroque music in the Netherlands, and possibly in the world. The ensemble was founded in 1921 in Naarden to perform Bach's St Matthew Passion on Good Friday and has performed the work annually since then in the Grote of Sint-Vituskerk (Great Church or St Vitus Church). From 1983 until 2018, Jos van Veldhoven was artistic director and conductor. Shunsuke Sato became artistic director on 1 June 2018.

The ensemble is now 100 years old. Due to the 100 year landmark, the Society is publishing a new and freely accessible recording every two weeks, including HD video of all 1080 works of Johann Sebastian Bach, performed by members of the ensemble and guest musicians under the title All of Bach.

History

Early years 

De Nederlandse Bachvereniging was officially founded on 13 September 1921. Johan Schoonderbeek was one of the founding members and the first conductor. He had already conducted the St Matthew Passion with the Koninklijke Oratorium Vereniging Excelsior (Royal Oratorio Society Excelsior) in The Hague. The Netherlands Bach Society first performed the St Matthew Passion on Good Friday, 14 April 1922. Following the praxis of the period, the complete work was not performed. Performances of the work became a tradition which has since been retained.

After Schoonderbeek's death in 1927, Evert Cornelis, conductor of the Utrechts Symfonie Orkest, took over and was the first to conduct the complete work. He died in 1931.

Anthon van der Horst 

He established regular performances of the St Matthew Passion and the Mass in B minor from 1931 until shortly before his death in 1965, attracting listeners from the Netherlands and abroad. He studied facsimiles and tried to keep close to the composer's intentions. In contrast Willem Mengelberg conducted a shortened version of the St Matthew Passion regularly on Palm Sunday in the Concertgebouw, taking a romantic approach with choirs of 450 singers. Nevertheless the performances in Naarden and Amsterdam were initially similar, because orchestra players of the Concertgebouworkest and soloists were the same.

Charles de Wolff 

Charles de Wolff succeeded Van der Horst in 1965. During this period the Concertgebouw tradition was continued by Eugen Jochum. The historically informed performance, initiated by Nikolaus Harnoncourt among others, won friends within the Netherlands Bach Society, who pursued performances with smaller ensembles on period instruments. Therefore De Wolff left the Bach Society in 1983, to work with the Bachkoor Holland.

Program 

Since 1983 the Netherlands Bach Society has a group of instrumentalists and singers specialized on music of the 17th and 18th century. The Bach Society performs about 50 concerts a year, concentrating on works of Bach and his family, his contemporaries and predecessors, such as Buxtehude, Carissimi, Charpentier, Grandi, Handel, De Koninck, Kuhnau, Mazzocchi, Monteverdi, Padbrué, Ritter, Scheidt, Schein, Schütz, Sweelinck, Telemann and Weckmann.

The artistic director from 1983 to 2018 was Jos van Veldhoven, who conducts about half of the concerts. Guest conductors have included Gustav Leonhardt, Paul McCreesh, Philippe Herreweghe, Frans Brüggen, Iván Fischer and Masaaki Suzuki. To keep the experience of the St Matthew Passion "fresh not only for himself but also for the players and for audiences", guest conductors have been invited every other year. Some of them conducted the work for the first time in Naarden, such as Ton Koopman and René Jacobs. Atzo Nicolai, minister of the Netherlands who regularly attends, stated: "St. Matthew’ during Holy Week is bigger in the Netherlands than Messiah at Christmas anywhere else".

Education 

The Netherlands Bach Society has collaborated with schools in a project to create interest in Bach's St Matthew Passion, reaching several hundred students and their teachers. In guest lessons, rehearsals, an interactive CD-Rom and a website, the students are prepared to listen to the concert while understanding its components and meaning.

List of conductors of The Passion 

 1922–1925: Johan Schoonderbeek
 1926–1927: Siegfried Ochs
 1929–1930: Evert Cornelis
 1931–1959: Anthon van der Horst
 1958: Felix de Nobel
 1959–1964: Anthon van der Horst
 1965-1983: Charles de Wolff
 1984: Jos van Immerseel
 1985: Ton Koopman
 1990: René Jacobs
 1991: Philippe Herreweghe
 1992: Ton Koopman
 1993: Jos van Veldhoven
 1994: Iván Fischer
 1995: Gustav Leonhardt
 1996: René Jacobs
 1997: Jos van Veldhoven
 1998: Sigiswald Kuijken
 1999: Hans-Christoph Rademann
 2000-2001: Jos van Veldhoven
 2002: Gustav Leonhardt
 2003: Marcus Creed
 2004: Jos van Veldhoven
 2005: Masaaki Suzuki
 2006: Jos van Veldhoven
 2007: Richard Egarr
 2008: Jos van Veldhoven
 2009: Lars Ulrik Mortensen
 2010: Jos van Veldhoven
 2011: 
 2012: 
 2013: 
 2014: Jos van Veldhoven
 2015: Stephan MacLeod
 2016: Jos van Veldhoven

Recordings 

The ensemble recorded, among others, in 1998 Bach's St Matthew Passion, conducted by Jos van Veldhoven, with Gerd Türk as the Evangelist, Geert Smits as Vox Christi, Johannette Zomer, Andreas Scholl, Hans Jörg Mammel and Peter Kooy, released on Channel Classics Records.

References

External links 
 Nederlandse Bachvereniging official website
 All of Bach website with a growing number of Bach recordings by the Netherlands Bach Society and guest musicians
 De Nederlandse Bachvereniging (Choir & Baroque Orchestra) bach-cantatas.com
 
 Matthew Gurewitsch: Playing the Numbers When Putting Voice to Bach The New York Times 15 April 2007

Early music choirs
Early music orchestras
Musical groups established in 1921
Dutch orchestras
Bach music ensembles
1921 establishments in the Netherlands
Arts organizations established in 1921
Gooise Meren